Latitude Festival is an annual music and arts festival set within the grounds of Henham Park, near Southwold, Suffolk, England.

The festival hosts music artists spanning across a multitude of genres. Headliners of this esteemed festival have included Lana Del Rey, The Killers, Kraftwerk, Nick Cave, Grace Jones and Florence and the Machine. Outside of music, the festival draws comedy fans from across the globe with previous headliners including Dara Ó Briain, Jo Brand, Katherine Ryan and Harry Hill. 

Not only does the weekend host daytime music but it has a vast offering for its customers including theatre & arts, late night programming, food, wellness and fun activities for families.

The festival is run by Festival Republic (formerly the Mean Fiddler Group).

Latitude Festival 2006

Latitude Festival 2007

Other acts
Other acts appearing over the three days included the following:

Au Revoir Simone
Bill Bailey
Bat for Lashes
Lenny Beige
The Book Club (with Robin Ince)
Camera Obscura
Alan Carr
Cold War Kids
Fancy Spaniels
Halloween Film Society
Arnab Chanda
Russell Howard
Phill Jupitus
The Light Surgeons
Lee Mack
Scott Matthews
Dylan Moran
Carol Morley
Kate Nash
Seasick Steve
Cherry Ghost
Chris Shepherd
Two Gallants

Latitude Festival 2008 
The 2008 line up was announced on 19 March 2008 with Franz Ferdinand headlining on the Friday, Sigur Rós on the Saturday, and Interpol on the Sunday.

Other music acts due to appear
The Exploits of Elaine (soundtracking Sarah Wood's film Book of Love)
M.I.A. was scheduled to headline the Sunrise Arena on the Sunday but pulled out due to ill health.
Ida Maria was scheduled to play on the main stage on Sunday but withdrew due to ill health.

Other artists
Comedy Arena acts included:

Friday - Andy Robinson, Robin Ince, Adam Bloom, Simon Day, Ben Norris, Marcus Brigstocke (standing in for Dave Fulton), Russell Howard, Daniel Rigby, Arnab Chanda, Ross Noble, Simon Evans, Lucy Porter, Phil Kay & Guilty Pleasures

Saturday - Stephen Grant, Dan Atkinson, Carey Marx, Tim Minchin, Scott Capurro, Jon Richardson, Bill Bailey, Jason Wood, Michael Fabbri, Jeremy Hardy, Miles Jupp, Rich Hall & Guilty Pleasures

Sunday - Rufus Hound, Russell Kane, Phill Jupitus, Steve Weiner, Andrew Lawrence, Frankie Boyle, Milton Jones, Lee Mack, Otis Lee Crenshaw, Stewart Lee, Hans Teeuwen, Omid Djalili & Swap-a-Rama

Film Arena appearances included:

Barry Adamson, George Pringle, Halloween Film Festival, Chris Shepherd, Their Hearts Were Full of Spring and Grind A Go-Go from 'Oh My God! I Miss You...'

In the Woods appearances:

Dirty Protest Theatre

Latitude Festival 2009
The fourth edition took place on 16–19 July 2009. Acts that played include Nick Cave and the Bad Seeds, Thom Yorke, Grace Jones and Pet Shop Boys as the main headliners, alongside Editors, Doves, and Bat for Lashes. The headliners and ticket details were announced on the Latitude Festival official site on 23 March 2009, at 7pm and sold out near to the event. More acts were confirmed at around 12:00 pm on the following day. These acts had already been previously reported on BBC Radio 1, but denied by festival organisers. Also announced in the press were The Gossip. On 3 April 2009 the official Latitude website confirmed Magazine, Spiritualized and Newton Faulkner to be playing. In June, it was announced that Thom Yorke would play an exclusive solo set as the festival's special guest (a role taken by Joanna Newsom in 2008).

BBC Radio covered the four day event with live music, comedy, sessions and interviews featured in shows across Radio 2, Radio 4, 6 Music and BBC Suffolk.

The total attendance for the weekend was 25,000.

The poetry arena included performances from Andrew Motion, Brian Patten, Roger Lloyd-Pack (performing T. S. Eliot's The Waste Land), Jackie Kay, Simon Armitage and Jeffrey Lewis; The Comedy Arena featured Jo Brand, Ed Byrne, Mark Thomas, Sean Lock, Adam Hills, Sean Hughes and Dave Gorman; The Theatre Arena showcased Royal Shakespeare Company, National Theatre, Bush Theatre and Paines Plough; The Literary Arena presented Blake Morrison, Jonathan Coe, Mark Steel, Vivienne Westwood, Sir Peter Blake, Frank Skinner and Luke Haines.

Latitude Festival 2010
Latitude 2010 (the fifth edition) took place on 15, 16, 17 and 18 July 2010. Initial lineup announcements were made at 7pm on Tuesday 9 March 2010. Capacity for the event was increased substantially to 35,000.

Security at Latitude 2010 
There was a reported gang rape on the first night of the festival which resulted in a heavy police presence for the remainder of the festival, including posters and flyers being handed out. Crystal Castles criticised the rapists during their performance on the Main Stage, calling the perpetrators "disgusting". A second rape was reported to have occurred on the second night though it attracted much less publicity than the first. Women were advised against going anywhere on site unaccompanied.

Latitude Festival 2011
Latitude 2011 (the sixth edition) took place on 14–17 July 2011. The first line up announcements were revealed on 14 March 2011. The three Obelisk headliners were revealed as well as a number of other artists and acts appearing across all stages.

Latitude Festival 2012
Latitude 2012 (the seventh edition) took place on 12–15 July 2012. The first line up announcements were revealed on 5 March 2012. The three Obelisk headliners were revealed alongside the three Word Arena headliners, as well as a number of other artists and acts appearing across all stages. What was previously known as the 'Sunrise Arena' was changed to the 'i Arena'.

Other artists who performed over the weekend include George Fitzgerald, Mosca, Shy FX, Skittles, Tuesday Born, and Lang Lang.

Latitude Festival 2013
Latitude 2013 (the eighth edition) took place on 18–21 July. The first acts were revealed on 19 March 2013. What was previously known as the Word Arena had its official name changed to the BBC Radio 6 Music Stage. A brand new music stage was introduced for 2013, The Alcove Stage, which showcased upcoming acts with many of the artists coming from the local area.

Also performing or DJing over the weekend included Abi Uttley, Anushka, Benin City, Bipolar Sunshine, The Busy Twist, Catfish and the Bottlemen, Chloe Howl, Dems, Duologue, The Establishment, The Family Rain, Gamu, Hero Fisher, Kins, Lizzie Bellamy, Lorca, Maglia Rosa Group, Marques Toliver, Milo Greene, MT Wolf, Mungo's Hi Fi, Ossie, Romare, Roy Davis, Jr., Ruen Brothers, Shox, Sivu, Superfood, Syd Arthur, Tuesday Born, Werkha, Zed Bias, and Josh Record.

Latitude Festival 2014
Latitude 2014 (the ninth edition) took place on 17–20 July. The first acts were revealed on 11 December 2013. The first headliner announced for the festival was going to be Two Door Cinema Club, but after singer Alex Trimble fell ill, Lily Allen headlined the Friday night. On 20 January Damon Albarn was announced as the festival's second headliner via Twitter. The third headliners announced were The Black Keys. Other acts who performed across the festival included Röyksopp, Robyn, Haim, Billy Bragg, Bombay Bicycle Club, Tame Impala, Slowdive, Hall & Oates, First Aid Kit, Booker T. Jones, Anna Calvi, Phosphorescent, Nils Frahm, Goat, Cass McCombs, Willis Earl Beal, Marika Hackman, San Fermin, Son Lux and Josephine Foster.

Headliners from the i Arena included:

James Holden (Live)
Young Fathers
Future Islands
Nils Frahm

Headliners from the Lake stage included:

Bondax
Cate Le Bon
Catfish and the Bottlemen
Luke Sital-Singh

Latitude Festival 2015
Latitude 2015 took place on Thursday 16 - Sunday 19 July. The initial lineup was announced on 10 March and included headliners alt-J, Portishead, and Noel Gallagher's High Flying Birds.

Latitude Festival 2016
Latitude 2016 took place on Thursday 14 - Sunday 17 July. The initial lineup was announced on 3 March and included headliners The Maccabees, The National and New Order. The National became the first band to headline the festival twice.

Latitude Festival 2017
Latitude 2017 took place on Thursday 13 - Sunday 16 July. It included a Gentlemen of the Road takeover curated by Mumford & Sons on the Saturday.

Latitude Festival 2018
Latitude 2018 took place on 12–15 July. The lineup was announced on 12 February 2018 with Solange, The Killers and alt-J as headliners. There was also a surprise set from Liam Gallagher on the Saturday in the BBC Music Arena.

Latitude Festival 2019
Latitude 2019 took place from 18 to 21 July. The first part of the lineup was announced on 24 January. The Friday was headlined by George Ezra and Sunday by Lana Del Rey. Snow Patrol were initially announced to headline the Saturday but pulled out due to injury and were replaced by Stereophonics. Other acts on the bill included Underworld, Loyle Carner, CHVRCHES, Neneh Cherry, Sigrid, Primal Scream, Everything Everything, Slaves, Marina and MØ.

Latitude Festival 2020
The festival's 15th edition would have taken place from Thursday 16 - Sunday 19 July 2020. It would have been headlined by Haim, Liam Gallagher and The Chemical Brothers. Other acts due to appear on the bill included Snow Patrol, Michael Kiwanuka, The Lumineers, Keane, Charli XCX, King Gizzard and the Lizard Wizard, Tove Lo and Celeste.

On 27 April the 2020 festival was cancelled due to the ongoing COVID-19 pandemic.

Latitude Festival 2021
Following the 2020 cancellation, the festivals 15th edition took place from 22–25 July 2021. It went ahead as a government backed test event for holding live events during the COVID-19 Pandemic. Friday was headlined by Wolf Alice, Saturday by The Chemical Brothers and Sunday co-headlined by Bastille and Bombay Bicycle Club. Other acts on the lineup included Kaiser Chiefs, Supergrass, Mabel, Rick Astley and Hot Chip. There were however some acts who had to withdraw from the festival due to Covid cases such as Fontaines DC, Arlo Parks, Alfie Templeman and Billie Marten

Latitude Festival 2022
The festivals 16th edition took place from 21–24 July 2022. Lewis Capaldi was headliner on the Friday, Foals on the Saturday and Snow Patrol on the Sunday.

Latitude Festival 2023
Organisers have confirmed the 17th edition will take place from the 20-23 July 2023. The three headliners were confirmed as  
 Pulp, 
Paolo Nutini and George Ezra with the remainder of the arts, comedy and late night music lineup to be announced in the lead up to the festival.  Yard Act, Young Fathers and Siouxsie will headline the BBC Sounds Stage.

See also
List of music festivals in the United Kingdom

References

External links

BBC Latitude 2021 review
Interviews with stars at Latitude Festival 2008 including Bill Bailey and Franz Ferdinand on ITV Local Anglia
Latitude Festival official site 
BBC Latitude coverage - Live tracks and radio shows from the festival
Henham Park official site
Mean Fiddler official site
eFestivals festival coverage
Warnfestival Latitude site
Skiddle Latitude festival guide
Latitude Festival highlights 2008, BAFTA events
Latitude Festival highlights 2009, BAFTA events

Music festivals in Suffolk
Cultural festivals in the United Kingdom
Rock festivals in England
Film festivals in England
Literary festivals in England
Theatre festivals in England
2006 establishments in England
Film festivals established in 2006
Music festivals established in 2006